The George B. McClellan was a fireboat operated by the FDNY from 1904 to 1954.  She was designed by Harry deBerkley Parsons, as were other FDNY fireboats built at the time.

The George B. McClellan was wrecked by an explosion, in 1954.  Another fireboat, the John D. McKean, was named after an engineer who died when he stayed at his post on the George B. McClellan when she exploded.

The George B. McClellan was named after the then-incumbent Mayor of New York City, the son of the Civil War General.

References

Fireboats of New York City
1904 ships
Ships built by New York Shipbuilding Corporation